

Literature
 It's in His Kiss, seventh novel of the Bridgerton series

Music
 The Shoop Shoop Song (It's in His Kiss)